Carinascincus is a genus of skinks (family Scincidae), commonly called snow skinks or cool-skinks and residing mainly in Tasmania or Victoria, Australia. Then recognised as the  genus Niveoscincus, it was found to belong to a clade with the genera Carlia, Lampropholis and others of the Eugongylus group within Lygosominae. Cogger has rejected the use of the junior name Niveoscincus and recognizes the valid senior generic name Carinascincus for the group. For similar skinks see genera Pseudemoia, Lampropholis, and Bassiana. These skinks have adapted to the cooler weather of southern Australia and particularly Tasmania, hence the common names.

Species
Carinascincus coventryi  – southern forest cool-skink
Carinascincus greeni  – alpine cool-skink or northern snow skink
Carinascincus metallicus  – metallic skink or metallic cool-skink
Carinascincus microlepidotus  – boulder cool-skink or southern snow skink
Carinascincus ocellatus  – spotted skink, ocellated cool-skink, or ocellated skink
Carinascincus orocryptus  – Tasmanian mountain skink, heath cool-skink, or mountain skink
Carinascincus palfreymani  – Pedra Branca skink, Pedra Branca cool-skink, or red-throated skink
Carinascincus pretiosus  – Tasmanian tree skink or agile cool-skink

References

Further reading
Hutchinson MN, Donnellan SC, Baverstock PR, Krieg M, Simms S, Burgin S (1990). "Immunological Relationships and Generic Revision of the Australian Lizards Assigned to the Genus Leiolopisma (Scincidae, Lygosominae)". Australian J. Zool. 38 (5): 535–554. (Niveoscincus, new genus). 
Cogger HG (2014). Reptiles and Amphibians of Australia, Seventh Edition. Clayton, Victoria, Australia: CSIRO Publishing. xxx + 1,033 pp. . 
Wells, Richard W.; Wellington, C. Ross (1985). "A Classification of the Amphibia and Reptilia of Australia". Australian Journal of Herpetology, Supplemental Series (1): 1-61. (Carinascincus, new genus, p. 24).

 
Lizard genera
Skinks of Australia
Taxa named by Richard Walter Wells
Taxa named by Cliff Ross Wellington